Regina Mina Mpontseng Lesoma is a South African politician who has served as a Member of the National Assembly of South Africa since 2012, representing the African National Congress (ANC). She was elected to a full term in 2014 and re-elected in 2019.

Lesoma currently serves on the Joint Committee on Ethics and Members' Interests, the Joint Standing Committee on the Financial Management of Parliament and the Rules Committee.

References

External links
Ms Regina Mina Mpontseng Lesoma at Parliament of South Africa
Lesoma, Regina Mina Mpontseng at ANC Parliamentary Caucus

Living people
Year of birth missing (living people)
Place of birth missing (living people)
People from KwaZulu-Natal
African National Congress politicians
Women members of the National Assembly of South Africa
Members of the National Assembly of South Africa